The Marches Way is a partially waymarked long-distance footpath in the United Kingdom. It runs for  through the Welsh–English borderlands, traditionally known as the Welsh Marches, and links the cities of Chester in the north and Cardiff in the south.

The route
The route starts at Chester at Chester railway station and then follows the valley of the River Dee southwards, before turning east into Malpas, Cheshire, and down to Whitchurch, Shropshire, before roughly following the B5476 road south to Shrewsbury via Wem. Once past Shrewsbury, the path scales the Long Mynd before reaching Church Stretton and Wenlock Edge and then entering Craven Arms, where there are excellent views of Flounder's Folly. The path then passes Stokesay Castle as it heads towards Ludlow. From Ludlow the route winds through the Mortimer Forest as it heads towards Leominster. From here the path climbs Dinmore Hill, crossing the A49 road as it navigates towards Hereford. The path passes through the town centre of Hereford, picking up the River Wye before heading towards Abbey Dore and Abergavenny where the path skirts the outer edge of the Brecon Beacons National Park, climbing and running along the ridge of the Skirrid mountain. The way then follows the Monmouthshire and Brecon Canal to Pontypool before heading towards Caerleon and Newport via the Llandegfedd Reservoir. Finally, the path heads towards its end point at Cardiff Central Railway Station via Caerphilly Common and Castell Coch at Tongwynlais.

It links many of the most important historic sites on both sides of the border, drawing together the history from Roman times, passing through two important Roman forts (Isca Augusta and Burrium), and the turbulent medieval periods when the border lands were contentious power bases vied over by Marcher Lords, Welsh princes and the scenes of rebellions, bloodletting and political power-broking by many of the region's historical characters.

The terrain of the footpath varies greatly as it proceeds from Chester to Cardiff, passing through the flat Cheshire Plain to the steep Shropshire Hills and the mountains of South Wales. The path passes through many woods, forests, riverbanks and farmland along its journey.

The route is waymarked only in Cheshire, with black and white waymarker discs.

Linked footpaths
The route crosses many different trails along its length, including:
The North Cheshire Way (Chester Spur) at Chester railway station
The Baker Way at Chester railway station
The Sandstone Trail at Tushingham (going past Old St. Chad's Chapel)
The Maelor Way and South Cheshire Way at Grindley Brook
The Shropshire Way at various points in Shropshire
The Mortimer Trail in the Mortimer Forest, Herefordshire
The Black and White Trail at Leominster
The Herefordshire Trail at various points in Herefordshire
The Offa's Dyke Path and the Beacons Way at Pandy
The Taff Trail at Tongwynlais, Cardiff

Mapping
The Marches Way was removed from the Ordnance Survey map series in 2004 after being detailed on these particular maps for approximately five years. The Ordnance Survey maps that included the Marches Way between 1999 and 2004 were:
OS Explorer OL13 – Brecon Beacons National Park (East)
OS Explorer 151 – Cardiff and Bridgend
OS Explorer 152 – Newport and Pontypool
OS Explorer 166 – Rhondda and Merthyr Tydfil
OS Explorer 189 – Hereford and Ross-on-Wye
OS Explorer 202 – Leominster and Bromyard
OS Explorer 203 – Ludlow, Tenbury Wells and Cleobury Mortimer
OS Explorer 217 – The Long Mynd and Wenlock Edge
OS Explorer 241 – Shrewsbury
OS Explorer 257 – Crewe and Nantwich
OS Explorer 266 – Chester and the Wirral
OS Landranger 117 – Chester and Wrexham
OS Landranger 126 – Shrewsbury and Oswestry
OS Landranger 137 – Church Stretton and Ludlow
OS Landranger 138 – Kidderminster and Wyre Forest
OS Landranger 148 – Presteigne and Hay-on-Wye
OS Landranger 149 – Hereford and Leominster
OS Landranger 161 – The Black Mountains
OS Landranger 171 – Cardiff and Newport

See also
 List of recreational walks in Cheshire

References

External links
 The Ramblers Association – basic info on the Marches Way
Photo of the trail near the Old School, Llanhennock, Monmouthshire
Photo on the bank of the River Dee

Long-distance footpaths in the United Kingdom
Recreational walks in Wales
Footpaths in Cheshire
Footpaths in Shropshire
Footpaths in Herefordshire
River Usk
Footpaths in Powys
Transport in Monmouthshire